Sir Francis Edward Scott, 3rd Baronet (25 February 1824 – 21 November 1863) was an English landowner.

On birth he succeeded his maternal grandfather Sir Hugh Bateman to the Baronetcy (but not the estates) of Bateman of Hartington, Derbyshire to become 2nd Baronet of Hartington.

He was the son of Sir Edward Scott, 2nd Baronet of Great Barr Hall, then Staffordshire who had married Catherine Juliana Bateman. In 1851 he succeeded his father to also become 3rd Baronet Scott of Great Barr.

He was one of the original officers of the 1st Staffordshire Rifle Volunteer Corps raised at Handsworth on 15 August 1859 during a French invasion scare.

He married Mildred Anne Cradock-Hartopp of Four Oaks Hall, Sutton Coldfield, (See Cradock-Hartopp baronets), by whom he had the following children:
 Sir Edward William Dolman Scott, 4th and 3rd Baronet, born 23 December 1854, died unmarried 1 April 1867.
 Sir Arthur Douglas Bateman Scott, 5th and 4th Baronet, born 3 September 1860, Captain, Staffordshire Yeomanry, died unmarried 18 March 1884, when he was succeeded by his uncle Sir Edmund Dolman Scott.

Notes

References

 A General and Heraldic Dictionary of the Peerage and Baronetage of the British Empire, Volume II John Burke (1832) p. 409. ( Google Books)

 Burke's Peerage, Baronetage and Knightage, 100th Edn, London, 1953.
 Ray Westlake, Tracing the Rifle Volunteers, Barnsley: Pen and Sword, 2010, .

Baronets in the Baronetage of the United Kingdom
1824 births
1863 deaths
English landowners
Great Barr
19th-century British businesspeople